J Ramachandran is a professor of corporate strategy at the Indian Institute of Management Bangalore. He teaches corporate strategy and policymaking. He was named as one of the nine best business school professors in India by Business Today in 2006. He is the first Bain fellow in India.

Education 
Ramachandran is a certified chartered accountant and cost accountant. He is an Associate Chartered Accountant (ACA) of Institute of Chartered Accountants of India (ICAI) and Associate Member (AICWA) of Institute of Cost and Works Accountants of India (ICWAI) and Institute of Company Secretaries of India (ICSI). He is a fellow of IIM Ahmedabad.

Career

Academic positions
He joined IIMB in 1992. He is currently a senior professor of corporate strategy. He is the Harry Reynolds Visiting International Professor, Wharton School of Business, University of Pennsylvania and a Visiting Fellow at INSEAD, France and Carlson School of Management, University of Minnesota.

Corporate positions
He is currently Chairman of Board of Directors at Redington India and Aditya Auto Products and Engineering. He also serves in the boards of Reliance Communications, Sasken Communication Technologies, MVA Group International, All Cargo Logistics, Antrix Corporation and Tejas Networks. He is a member of the editorial Board of Journal of Entrepreneurship and Governance Council of Mudra Institute of Communications, Ahmedabad.

Cases and papers
He has authored more than 100 papers and cases which have been published in journals across the world including Harvard Business Review.

References

Academic staff of the Indian Institute of Management Bangalore
Living people
Year of birth missing (living people)